This article lists the presidents of Burundi since the formation of the post of President of Burundi in 1966 (following the November coup d'état), to the present day.

A total of nine people have served in the office. Additionally, one person, Pierre Buyoya, served on two non-consecutive occasions.

The current president of Burundi is Évariste Ndayishimiye, since 18 June 2020.

Key
Political parties

Other factions

Status

List of officeholders

Timeline

See also

 Politics of Burundi
 List of kings of Burundi
 President of Burundi
 Vice-President of Burundi
 Prime Minister of Burundi
 List of colonial governors of Ruanda-Urundi
 List of colonial residents of Burundi

Notes

References

External links
World Statesmen – Burundi

Burundi
 
1966 establishments in Burundi
Presidents
Presidents